The Battle of Dongola (1276) was a battle fought between the Mamluk Sultanate under Baibars and the Kingdom of Makuria. The Mamluks gained a decisive victory, capturing the Makurian capital Dongola, forcing the king David of Makuria to flee and placing a puppet on the Makurian throne. After this battle the Kingdom of Makuria went into a period of decline until its collpase in the 15th century

Background 

The Baqt was an agreement between the Muslims of Egypt and the Christians of Nubia which had guaranteed peace between the two opposing groups for over 600 years at this point and is in many ways the longest lasting treaty in history. The treaty greatly benefitted the Makurians, who gained friendly relations with a powerful neighbour, with the main drawback being that they were required to send 360 slaves a year to Egypt, which was later negotiated down so the payment was only made every 3 years. However the treaty never fully stopped conflict and small scale raiding often occurred between both sides

The exact reasons for the breakout of war between Makurian king David and Egyptian sultan Baibars are not known but was most likely a simple unwillingness by David to pay the Baqt to the upstart Mamluk state, as the Mamluks had only came to power in 1250 and were seemingly not viewed favourably by David. There is also evidence raids between the two sides had been occurring for a few years before the reigns of both Baibars and David. This already strained relationship was likely not helped by the arrival of Shekenda, a Makurian prince with a claim to David’s throne, in the Mamluk court. These factors would lead the two states to full scale war, which started in 1272 as the Nubians sacked the Egyptian town of Aidhab. This was followed by Nubian raid on Aswan in 1275

Battle

In 1276 Sultan Baibars led a campaign into Nubia and fought David of Makuria in a series of battles that culminated in Makuria's defeat at their capital of Dongola. Very little details about the engagement are known but it was a heavy defeat for the Makurian army. David was forced to flee and Dongola fell. Baibars placed Shekenda on the throne where he would rule as a Mamluk vassal. The battle signified the beginning of the end for Makuria as the state would slowly shrink in territory over the coming century in the face of increased aggression from its Muslim neighbours, eventually disappearing altogether in the 15th century

References

 

Dongola
Dongola
13th century in the Mamluk Sultanate
Kingdom of Makuria
Military history of Africa